Mitchell Township may refer to:

 Mitchell Township, Cross County, Arkansas, in Cross County, Arkansas
 Mitchell Township, Mitchell County, Iowa
 Mitchell Township, Nemaha County, Kansas, in Nemaha County, Kansas
 Mitchell Township, Rice County, Kansas, in Rice County, Kansas
 Mitchell Township, Michigan
 Mitchell Township, Wilkin County, Minnesota
 Mitchell Township, Bertie County, North Carolina, in Bertie County, North Carolina
 Mitchell Township, Davison County, South Dakota

Township name disambiguation pages